The World of Peter Rabbit and Friends is a British animated anthology television series based on the works of Beatrix Potter, featuring Peter Rabbit and other anthropomorphic animal characters created by Potter. 14 of Potter's stories were adapted into 9 films, and the series was originally shown in the U.K. on the BBC between 20 December 1992 and 25 December 1998. It was subsequently broadcast in the U.S. on Family Channel between 23 October 1992 and 23 October 1995. For the initial VHS releases, some of the characters' voices were dubbed-over by actors with more American-like accents.

Production
TVC London, in association with the BBC and the Japanese companies Pony Canyon Inc and Fuji Television Network Inc., produced the show for the publishing company Frederick Warne & Co. The first six episodes cost approximately £5 million to produce. Dianne Jackson, director of the 1982 Christmas special The Snowman, was involved in the planning of the series and received series director and writer credit on the first six episodes, but she died of cancer on New Year's Eve 1992. The animation style of The World of Peter Rabbit and Friends keeps very close to Potter's artwork in the original books. The main title song for the show is Perfect Day sung by Miriam Stockley. The live-action scenes in Potter's cottage and grounds were filmed on location at her actual cottage, 'Hill Top', in Cumbria, which is maintained unchanged as a museum by the National Trust.

Contents
Each episode opens up with a live-action Beatrix Potter, portrayed by actress Niamh Cusack, coming to her farmhouse out of the rain, either after finishing a watercolour painting and running home with her pet dog, Kep, or after doing the shopping in town and hitching a ride home on a horse-drawn vehicle, sitting down to some tea with her pet rabbit, Peter, and then setting up the featured story. Once Potter finishes the story, she either posts the picture letter herself or asks a boy to do it. 
An exception to this is The Tailor of Gloucester episode, which takes place at Christmas time. The Tailor of Gloucester, unlike the other episodes, begins with Potter's maid, Daisy, serving out mince pies to some carol singers who sing the Sussex Carol while Potter and her pet cat, Simpkin, listen to them, and it ends with pictures taken from the main story. Some of the episodes include storylines from two separate books, either told one after the other or intermingled.

Episodes

Cast
 Niamh Cusack – Beatrix Potter (live action)
 Mark Lockyer - Peter Rabbit (adult), Alexander
 Rory Carty (UK) / Robert Carey (US) – Peter Rabbit (young)
 Adrian Scarborough - Benjamin Bunny (adult)
 Andrew Clitheroe (UK) / Daniel Peter Klein (US) – Benjamin Bunny (young)
 Enn Reitel – Mr. Bouncer, Robin, Grocer, Drake Puddle-Duck , Kep, Sparrows, Animals, & Insects
 June Whitfield – Mrs. Rabbit
 Richard Wilson (UK) / Andrew Robertson (US) – Mr. McGregor
 Richard Griffiths – Mr. Alderman Ptolomy Tortoise, Sir Isaac Newton, Mr. Jackson
 Ian Holm – The Tailor of Gloucester
 Dan Russell - Mouse Tailor, Mices
 Derek Griffiths - Simpkin
 Hugh Laurie – Johnny Town-Mouse
 Alan Bennett - Timmy Willie
 Prunella Scales – Mrs. Tiggy-Winkle
 Rebecca Hall - Lucie
 Rik Mayall -  Tom Thumb
 Felicity Kendal - Hunca Munca
 Alan Bowe (UK) / Atsuyuki Fujinuma (US) - Tom Kitten
 Katie Wilkins (US) - Moppet
 Rachel Azoulay (US) - Mittens
 Rosemary Leach - Tabitha Twitchit
 Patricia Routledge - Ribby
 Struan Rodger - Samuel Whiskers
 Sheila Hancock - Anna Maria
 John Gordon Sinclair - John Joiner
 Su Pollard (UK) / Sandra Dickinson (US) - Jemima Puddle-Duck
 Pam Ferris - Aunt Pettitoes
 Dinsdale Landen - Mr. Tod
 Don Henderson - Tommy Brock
 Derek Jacobi - Jeremy Fisher
 Chris Lang - Pigling Bland
 Josie Lawrence - Pig-Wig
 Selina Cadell - Rebeccah Puddle-Duck
 Sheila Steafel - Flopsy (adult), Cook & Nurse
 Jenny Moore - Flopsy (young), Moppet (UK), Flopsy Bunnies
 Mary Jane Bowe - Mopsy, Mittens (UK), Flopsy Bunnies
 Sarah Woolcock - Cotton-Tail, Flopsy Bunnies
 Anna Massey – Mrs. Tittlemouse
 June Watson – Mrs. McGregor
 Suzanne Bonetti - Sarah the parlour maid & the Child, Mice, Insects
 Anthony Jackson - Policeman
 David Neal - Mr. Piperson the Farmer
 Kim Parker & Nichola Dawson - Flopsy Bunnies
 Moir Lesley - Female Sparrow
 Bob Saker - Mices
 Deb Strafford - Mices
 Bruce Ogston, Phillip Dogham, Lynda Richardson & Rosemary Ashe - Singers

Documentaries
When the films were released on VHS, they featured a special mini documentary at the end.

References

External links

 

Peter Rabbit
1992 British television series debuts
1998 British television series endings
1990s British children's television series
British television shows based on children's books
British television series with live action and animation
British children's animated anthology television series
English-language television shows
BBC children's television shows
Fuji TV original programming
The Family Channel (American TV network, founded 1990) original programming
Australian Broadcasting Corporation original programming
Animated television series about rabbits and hares
Animated television series about mice and rats
Animated television series about cats
Animated television series about pigs
Animated television series about dogs
Animated television series about hedgehogs
Animated television series about ducks
Animated television series about frogs
Animated television series about foxes
Television series by Sony Pictures Television